Cryoturris adamsii is a species of sea snail, a marine gastropod mollusk in the family Mangeliidae.

Description
The length of the shell attains 7 mm.

Distribution
C. adamsii can be found in Atlantic waters, the Gulf of Mexico and the Caribbean Sea, ranging from the coast of Texas south to Brazil.

References

 Smith, Edgar A. "Report on the zoological collections made in the Indo-Pacific Ocean during the voyage of HMS Alert 1881–1882." London: British Museum (1884): 487–508.
 G., F. Moretzsohn, and E. F. García. 2009. Gastropoda (Mollusca) of the Gulf of Mexico, Pp. 579–699 in Felder, D.L. and D.K. Camp (eds.), Gulf of Mexico–Origins, Waters, and Biota. Biodiversity. Texas A&M Press, College Station, Texas

External links
 
  Tucker, J.K. 2004 Catalog of recent and fossil turrids (Mollusca: Gastropoda). Zootaxa 682:1-1295.

adamsii